Țânțăreni is a commune in Gorj County, Oltenia, Romania. It is composed of four villages: Arpadia, Chiciora, Florești and Țânțăreni.

References

Communes in Gorj County
Localities in Oltenia